The Narragansett Brewing Company is an American brewery founded in Cranston, Rhode Island in 1890. Founders included John H. Fehlberg, Augustus F. Borchandt, Herman G. Possner, George M. Gerhard, Constand A. Moeller, and Jacob Wirth.

Narragansett was formerly the number one selling brand in New England, but it now occupies a relatively narrow segment of the market. It was originally brewed in the city of Cranston, and was famous for its drinkability and the advertising slogan, "Hi, Neighbor, have a 'Gansett!," most famously uttered by Boston Red Sox announcer Curt Gowdy.

History
Narragansett Brewing Company was founded in 1890 with US$150,000 in capital. A brick brewing house was built in Cranston, Rhode Island, and in December 1890, the first beer was produced. The following year, the company officially incorporated.

The grounds of the Narragansett Brewing Company included a barn, a stable, a blacksmith, seventy-five horses, forty-five wagons, gas-powered trucks, electric trucks, twenty-five refrigerated train cars and its own ice plant.

In 1914, when the company built the most modern bottling plant in the region, it became official: Narragansett Brewing Company was the largest lager beer brewery in New England.  Rudolf F. Haffenreffer, a Rhode Island industrialist and philanthropist with Massachusetts brewing interests, would eventually become president and chairman of Narragansett Brewing Company and remain involved until his death in 1954. The Haffenreffer brewery in Boston survived until 1965, at which time brands Haffenreffer Lager Beer, Pickwick Ale and Pickwick Bock Beer were licensed to the Narragansett Brewing Company.

Falstaff Brewing Company purchased Narragansett Brewing Company on July 15, 1965 for $17 million in cash and $2 million in Falstaff common stock. The plan was for the brewery to continue operating as a wholly owned subsidiary of Falstaff, under Haffenreffer management, and that the Narragansett brand would be retained and actively promoted. The purchase was very controversial and the state government of Rhode Island pursued an antitrust case against Falstaff. The Supreme Court found in Falstaff's favor in United States v. Falstaff Brewing Corp. (1973), but the company never recovered.

Multi-millionaire leveraged buyout specialist Paul Kalmanovitz obtained majority control of Narragansett's parent corporation, the Falstaff Brewing Co., on April 28, 1975. The San Francisco corporate raider bought the brewery for an undisclosed amount.  Soon after the purchase Falstaff's corporate headquarters moved from St. Louis, Missouri to San Francisco, California.

The brewery officially closed on July 31, 1981.  When production of the beer moved to the Falstaff plant in Fort Wayne, Indiana in 1982, many felt that the quality of the beer was not the same, and the decline in sales accelerated.  After sitting abandoned for over a decade, demolition began on the main brewery buildings on October 27, 1998.  The brewery's Trolley Barn located across the street was spared for redevelopment, but eventually succumbed to the wrecking ball in June 2005.  The Cranston Municipal Courthouse and the Sanford-Brown Institute were both built on the site of the brewery proper, with the trolley barn lot still remaining vacant.  In a large lot south of the former brewery grounds is the Cranston Parkade, originally opened in 2000 as the Brewery Parkade, a retail plaza anchored by a Kmart, a Lowe's and a Stop & Shop.  The original name was a nod to the neighboring brewery.

After changing hands several times, the brand was bought in 2005 by a team of local Rhode Island investors led by former juice executive Mark D. Hellendrung, who announced plans to expand its market share and reinvigorate the Narragansett brand identity.  Since the purchase, the brand has been revitalized with the help of former brewer Bill Anderson, and new packaging.  Narragansett beer, now contract brewed by Genesee Brewing Company, has been available again throughout Southern New England since spring of 2006. The lager and light beers are brewed at their brewery in Rochester, New York, while the bock and porter are craft-brewed in Providence, Rhode Island and Pawcatuck, Connecticut. The brand also produces a summer ale, available during the summer season and a cream ale, a year-round offering. On April 3, 2016, it was announced that the Narragansett Beer brewery would be relocating to Pawtucket, Rhode Island.  Brewing in Pawtucket began early in 2017, with the first batch produced in March 2017, an IPA appropriately named, "It's About Time".

Most recently, Narragansett Brewing Company opened its official brewery located along the famous East Bay Bike Path near India Point Park in Providence, Rhode Island. The brewery offers a variety of craft beer selections brewed on site by head brewer Lee Lord.

Advertising

Naragansett sponsored Boston Red Sox and Braves baseball broadcasts through much of the first half of the 20th century. The Braves switched sponsors to P. Ballantine & Sons in 1950, while the Sox stayed with Narragansett. For years, announcers such as Jim Britt, Curt Gowdy and Kevin Baker touted the "straight from the barrel taste" of 'Gansett, brewed with "seedless hops." In the late 1960s, Narragansett was replaced by F & M Schaefer Brewing as sponsor of Red Sox Baseball, which was followed by a decline in its popularity.

During the 1940s Theodor Geisel better known as Dr. Seuss was hired by the Narragansett Brewing Company to create advertising pieces for the company. It was at this time that the Chief Gansett character came to be.

In October 2012, coinciding with Shark Week, Narragansett reintroduced a can design from 1975, which was featured in the movie Jaws. In the 1975 film, Captain Quint, the shark hunter played by Robert Shaw, crushes a can of Narragansett with one hand to intimidate the oceanographer, Matt Hooper played by Richard Dreyfuss. The campaign featured the tagline "Honor the man. Crush the can." and the Twitter hashtag #CrushItLikeQuint. A variety of Narragansett beers are drunk by characters in the 2020 horror film The Block Island Sound. A can of Narragansett is also drunk by Greg Kinnear's character in the third episode of the 2020-21 miniseries The Stand.

See also
Rudolf F. Haffenreffer

References

Bibliography
Downing, Neil. "Narragansett Beer returning to Rhode Island". The Providence Journal, July 23, 2005.

External links
Boston Phoenix: Narragansett Beer

Beer brewing companies based in Rhode Island
Falstaff Brewing Corporation
Pabst Brewing Company
American beer brands
Food and drink companies established in 1888
1888 establishments in Rhode Island
American companies established in 1888